Claudio Solone (born 12 April 1953) is a former Italian male long-distance runner who competed at four editions of the IAAF World Cross Country Championships (from 1974 to 1981), and won two national championships at senior level.

References

External links
 Claudio Solone profile at Association of Road Racing Statisticians

1953 births
Living people
Italian male long-distance runners
Italian male cross country runners